Laura Valenti (born 6 February 1984 in Arezzo, Tuscany, Italy) was the winner of the Miss Universo Italia 2009 pageant that was held at the Palariccione in Riccione, Emilia-Romagna on 24 May 2009. She represented Italy at the Miss Universe 2009 pageant at the Atlantis Paradise Island, in Nassau, Bahamas on 23 August. Despite a strong showing during the preliminary competition, she failed to place among the semifinalists.

She is a model and a professional dancer who practiced rhythmic gymnastic competitively from 1994 to 1997. She was accepted into the ballet company at the Teatro alla Scala in Milan, taking part in the productions of Swan Lake, The Nutcracker, Giselle, Carmen, La Sylphide, Rigoletto and Cinderella among others. As a model, she has appeared in campaigns for Swarovski and Coin, an Italian luxury goods department store.

References

1984 births
Living people
Miss Universe 2009 contestants
People from Arezzo
Italian female dancers
Italian female models
Italian beauty pageant winners